HaAh HaGadol 4 (lit. The Big Brother 4) is the fourth season of the Israeli version of the reality show Big Brother.

The season began broadcasting on 1 January 2012, and ended on 2 April 2012. Seventeen housemates entered the house at the premiere, and another housemate joined after 22 days. Another three housemates joined after 45 days. the premiere episode scored an unprecedented 45% on the ratings chart.

The season showcases, among other personalities, a contestant with an intense hatred for Arabs, a pro-Palestinian sympathizer, a newlywed couple, and a blind man with his guide dog.

Themes
Religion, politics and ethnicity have been among the themes to generate tension between contestants in the Big Brother house during the fourth season.

Yekutiel "Kuti" Sebbag refused to eat food cooked by Avivit Bar-Zohar one Sabbath eve, leading Eran Tartakovsky to call Sebbag a whiny hypocrite but also leading Bar-Zohar to go on a fast on account of preventing a Jew from eating on the Sabbath.

Controversial remarks made by Saar Szekely in reference to Israeli policy in the West Bank drew criticism from the Israeli settlement of Ariel, which issued a statement regretting that Big Brother had offered Szekely a platform for his views. Various Facebook groups called Szekely a traitor and demanded his removal from the show.

Housemates

Housemate exchange
From February 27 to March 5, 2012, 18-year-old Model Victoria Irouleguy from Gran Hermano Argentina 7 where she spent 7 days in the Israel house as part of the Israel Week. On the same week (February 27 to March 5), the Israel housemate Sophie Karwacki spent 7 days in the Argentina house.

Nominations table

References

External links
  

2012 Israeli television seasons
04

he:האח הגדול (תוכנית טלוויזיה ישראלית)#עונה רביעית (2012)